Hacon is a personal name. Notable people with the name include:

 Hacon of Sweden (disambiguation), multiple people
 Christopher Hacon (born 1970), mathematician with British, Italian and US nationalities
Edith Hacon (1875–1952), Scottish suffragist from Dornoch, a World War One nursing volunteer, as well as an international socialite
 Rod Hacon, Australian Paralympic skier

See also
 Haakon (disambiguation)
 Håkan, given name